Fem porn may refer to:
 Feminist pornography (feminist porn, fem porn), a style of pornography based on sex-positive feminist ideas
 Porn for women (women's porn, women's pornography, female porn, fem porn), a genre of pornography aimed at a female audience

See also 
 Women's erotica, any erotic material (including literature, games, audio, photography, and video) aimed at a female audience